The Kropyvna Regiment was one the territorial-administrative subdivisions of the Cossack Hetmanate. The regiment's capital was the city of Kropyvna, now a village in Cherkasy Oblast of central Ukraine.

In 1648, during Khmelnytsky Uprising , Irkliiv Regiment was raised, with colonel Mykhailo Teliuchenko commanding it. On 16 October 1649 Irkliiv and neighboring part of Lubny Regiment were merged to form Kropyvna Regiment. The only regimental colonel was Filon Dzhelaliy.

Hetman Ivan Vyhovsky disbanded the regiment in 1658 after death of colonel Filon Dzhelaliy. The regiments sotnias were all transferred to recreated Irkliiv Regiment and Lubny Regiment.

Structure
The regiment comprised 14 sotnias with 2010 cossacks:
Zaruba and Kryvosheja give the regiment 1992 cossacks in 1649. Giving 3 Irkliiv companies 631 cossacks, the register lists them having 640. Also 2 Pyriatyn companies had 307, as opposed to registers 306.
In 1650 register sent by Bohdan Khmelnytsky to Alexis of Russia, strength of regiment is given at 2053.

Notes

Commanders
Filon Dzhelaliy 1648-1658

References

Sources 

Cossack Hetmanate Regiments
History of Cherkasy Oblast